Ankur Jain (born c. 1990) is an American entrepreneur and investor who is the founder and CEO of Bilt Rewards, the first loyalty program that allows renters to earn points on rent. Jain has grown the company to a valuation of $1.5 billion since its launch in June, 2021.

Prior to launching Bilt Rewards, he was the founder and CEO of Kairos. He was previously the founder and CEO of technology company, Humin, which was acquired by Tinder in 2016. After the acquisition, Jain served as VP of Product for Tinder until May 2017.

Jain has been a frequent guest on CNBC and Fox Business Network. In October 2017, Jain was named a Young Global Leader by the World Economic Forum. He was called “The Best Connected 21-year-old-in the World” by Inc. and named to the 30 under 30 list by Forbes, as well as similar lists by Inc. and The Christian Science Monitor.

Early life 
Ankur Jain was born in Bellevue, Washington, part of the Seattle metropolitan area. He grew up in Redmond, Washington and his parents are Anu and Naveen Jain, both entrepreneurs in the technology industry. 

Jain attended Wharton School of the University of Pennsylvania.

Career 
In 2008, Jain founded the Kairos Society, an incubator for young entrepreneurs. Through Kairos, Jain identified entrepreneurs coming out of universities and worked with them to launch new ventures tackling issues in areas like healthcare, clean water, global transportation, and education. As of May 2017, companies coming out of the Kairos program have gone on to raise a total of more than $600 million and have a combined value of more than $3 billion. Kairos Society was also named a partner in President Barack Obama's Startup America Partnership.

In 2012, Jain left to become the founder and CEO of technology company, Humin. The San-Francisco-based startup developed a new address book that organized contacts by contextual cues like where people met, where contacts live, and what they do. Jain raised $15 million for Humin before the company was acquired by Tinder in 2016.

Following the acquisition, Jain stayed on as vice president of product at Tinder. He is rumored to be behind the development of Tinder Select, a version of Tinder for famous celebrities and public figures.

Jain left Tinder in May 2017 to rejoin Kairos and launch a new venture fund focused on building solutions to issues such as student debt, affordable housing, child care, and worker retention. Since the fund’s announcement, Jain has helped launch a company called Rhino to replace security deposits with a low monthly fee. He has also partnered with UK-based startup, Cera, to bring home care to the elderly.

In June 2021, Jain launched Bilt Rewards, a company he incubated at his venture fund, Kairos. Bilt Rewards operates both a loyalty program and a co-brand credit card, the Bilt Mastercard, that enable consumers to earn points on their rent payments with no transaction fees, while also building a path to homeownership. The Bilt Rewards loyalty program was developed in partnership with an alliance of the nation’s largest real estate owners, while the Bilt Mastercard was developed with and issued by Wells Fargo.

In October 2022, Bilt Rewards, announced a growth round of $150 million led by Left Lane Capital with investment from Smash Capital, Wells Fargo, Greystar, Invitation Homes, Camber Creek, Fifth Wall, and Prosus Ventures to further expand its loyalty program and credit card product. The new capital valued Bilt Rewards at $1.5 billion.

References

External links 
 

People from Bellevue, Washington
American technology company founders
Wharton School of the University of Pennsylvania alumni
1990 births
Living people
American technology chief executives
21st-century American businesspeople
University of Pennsylvania alumni
American people of Indian descent
American Jains